Luteba is an administrative ward in the Busokelo District of the Mbeya Region of Tanzania. In 2016 the Tanzania National Bureau of Statistics report there were 7,837 people in the ward.

Villages / neighborhoods 
The ward has 6 villages and 23 hamlets.

 Mpunguti
 Ibwe
 Itete
 Kabula
 Kamasulu
 Mwakaleli
 Luteba
 Kasanga
 Majwesi
 Ndamba
 kilasi
 Kilasi
 Luteba
 Ngela
 Ipuguso
 Ikano
 Ipuguso
 Kisondela
 Lusoko
 Nsebo
 Ikubo
 Ibungu
 Igembe
 Ikubo
 Itebe
 Kikwego
 Isale
 Ipyela
 Itimbo

References

Wards of Mbeya Region